Walter Stöhrer (1937–2000) was a German painter born in Stuttgart. Between 1952 and 1954 he studied as a commercial graphical artist (Werbegraphiker), receiving a journeyman's certificate. In 1955 he began to study painting at the Academy of Arts (Akademie der Bildenden Künste) in Karlsruhe and in 1957 became a member of the class of HAP Grieshaber, where he remained until 1959. In 1959 he left Karlsruhe for Berlin, to operate and live as free artist. In 1984 Stöhrer became a member of the Academy of the Arts in Berlin. Between 1981 and 1982 he was visiting professor at the Hochschule (now Universität)  der Künste, the Berlin University of the Arts. In 1986 he obtained a chair at that same institution.

Awards
 1962 Stuttgart, German Youth Art Prize
 1964 Berlin, Critics' Prize of the City of Berlin
 1971 Berlin, Will Grohmann Prize of the Academy of Art
 1976 Berlin, Berlin Art Prize of the Academy of Art
 1977 Villa Romana Prize
 1978 Esslingen, Kreissparkasse Art Prize
 1980 Bremen, Böttcherstraße Art Prize
 1981–1982 Berlin, visiting professor at the Hochschule der Künste
 1982 Nordhorn City Art Prize
 1995 Stuttgart, Molfenter Prize
 1999 Reutlingen, Jerg Ratgeb Prize
 2000 Schleswig, Dr. Friedrich Schultz Prize

The Walter Stöhrer-Stiftung (Walter Stöhrer-Foundation) is  working on an edition of his collected writings on art.

External links
Walter Stöhrer-Foundation
ArtInfo-International on Walter Stöhrer (in German), the source of the first version of this article.

1937 births
2000 deaths
Artists from Stuttgart
20th-century German painters
20th-century German male artists
German male painters
Members of the Academy of Arts, Berlin